Setsuji (written:  or  in hiragana) is a masculine Japanese given name. Notable people with the name include:

, Japanese actor and voice actor
, Japanese rower

Japanese masculine given names